Xhevdet Gela (born 14 November 1989) is a Finnish football player of Kosovar descent currently playing for Ekenäs IF. Besides Finland, he has played in Poland.

Career

HIFK
Gela signed for HIFK on 4 January 2019.

References

External links

  
  
 Profile at atlantisfc.fi 

1989 births
Living people
Finnish footballers
Finnish expatriate footballers
Finnish people of Albanian descent
Association football midfielders
FC Honka players
FC Espoo players
AC Allianssi players
Atlantis FC players
PK-35 Vantaa (men) players
Myllykosken Pallo −47 players
FC Haka players
Widzew Łódź players
FC Lahti players
HIFK Fotboll players
Ekenäs IF players
Veikkausliiga players
Ykkönen players
Ekstraklasa players
Finnish expatriate sportspeople in Poland
Expatriate footballers in Poland